Naresh Uttam Patel (born 10 January 1956) is a leader of the Samajwadi Party and member of Uttar Pradesh Legislative Council. He first became an MLA as a Janata Dal candidate in 1989 and is one of the founding members of the Samajwadi Party.
Currently, he isUttar Pradesh State President of Samajwadi Party, second only to Chief Minister Akhilesh Yadav in the organisational setup in party state unit. With his clean image and educated background (post-graduate from Kanpur University, he has earned a reputation of grass-root leader with wider following among the dominant Kurmi caste voters.

His elevation to such an important position indicates Party's new inclusive agenda that can help change image of the Party. He was the Minister in first Mulayam Government from 1989 to 1991 and three times Member of UP Legislative House. He was member of the Backward Class Commission and also member of the Janeshawar Mishra Trust. He was appointed Deputy State President when UP CM Akhilesh Yadav was Uttar Pradesh State President of Samajwadi Party, however when Shivpal Singh Yadav became UP State President of SP, he was removed. He belongs to Kurmi OBCs caste of UP and has been considered to be close to Mulayam Singh Yadav.

He is also one of the founding MLAs of Samajwadi Party. Being a loyalist  of OBCs, he has been entrusted with the screening of candidates for the 2017 state elections.

References

People from Fatehpur district
Samajwadi Party politicians
Uttar Pradesh MLAs 1989–1991
Members of the Uttar Pradesh Legislative Council
Chhatrapati Shahu Ji Maharaj University alumni
Living people
21st-century Indian politicians
1956 births
Samajwadi Party politicians from Uttar Pradesh